Makita is a village in Otepää Parish, Valga County in southeastern Estonia. Makita has a population of 22 (as of 1 January 2011).

References

Villages in Valga County